State Route 121 (SR 121) is a state highway in western Ohio. It starts at Indiana State Road 121 near New Paris, Ohio, and ends at State Route 47 and State Route 185 in Versailles, Ohio.

Major intersections

References

121
Transportation in Darke County, Ohio
Transportation in Preble County, Ohio